DR-4 is the fourth numbered highway of the Dominican Republic. It starts from Santo Domingo eastwards to San Pedro de Macorís and then to the north to Hato Mayor del Rey and again eastwards ending in the San Rafael del Yuma (or Boca de Yuma).

*Notes: Where the highway begins is disputed, some say Santo Domingo others Santo Domingo Este. There is  unclear information given by SEOPC about where the highway ends.

See also
Highways and routes in the Dominican Republic

References

Highways and routes in the Dominican Republic